The Dutch television mystery music game show I Can See Your Voice premiered the third season on RTL 4 on 21 January 2022.

Gameplay

Format
Under the original format, the contestant can eliminate one or two mystery singers after each round. The game concludes with the last mystery singer standing which depends on the outcome of a duet performance with a guest artist.

Rewards
If the singer is good, the contestant wins ; if the singer is bad, the same amount is given to the bad singer instead.

Rounds
Each episode presents the guest artist and contestant with seven people whose identities and singing voices are kept concealed until they are eliminated to perform on the "stage of truth" or remain in the end to perform the final duet.

Episodes

Guest artists

Reception

Television ratings

Source:

Notes

References

I Can See Your Voice (Dutch game show)
2022 Dutch television seasons